Behçet is a Turkish name and may refer to:

Given name
 Behçet Cantürk, Turkish mob boss
 Behçet Necatigil, Turkish author and poet
 Behçet Uz, Turkish politician and doctor

Surname
 Hulusi Behçet, Turkish dermatologist and scientist

Other uses
 Behçet's disease, Autoimmune disease

Turkish-language surnames
Turkish masculine given names